Five Manhattan West is a building at 450 West 33rd Street in Hudson Yards, Manhattan, New York City.  Also known as Westyard Distribution Center, it was designed by Davis Brody Bond and opened in 1969.  The , 16-story building originally had a beige precast concrete facade with a sloped base, and although the facade was cleaned up in 2003, it was seen as out of place with the architecture of the surrounding neighborhood.

The New York Daily News moved to 450 West 33rd Street in 1995 from its former headquarters at 220 East 42nd Street. The structure also housed DoubleClick from 1999 to 2003. The Associated Press moved to 450 West 33rd Street from its former headquarters at Rockefeller Center in the early 2000s, and remains in the building .

2014 renovation 
In 2014, the brutalist concrete exterior was replaced with a glass facade and its interior and mechanical systems were also renovated. When renovation of the building was completed, it was renamed 5 Manhattan West. It houses offices of Amazon and JP Morgan Chase.

The building sits above rail tracks running west from Penn Station, and the portals of the North River Tunnels and Empire Connection are beneath the building.

References

Brookfield Properties buildings
Hudson Yards, Manhattan
Office buildings completed in 1969
Brutalist architecture in New York City